Madison Township is one of the twelve townships of Jackson County, Ohio, United States.  As of the 2010 census, 2,188 people lived in the township, including 1,549 in its unincorporated areas.

Geography
Located in the southeastern corner of the county, it borders the following townships:
Bloomfield Township: north
Huntington Township, Gallia County: northeast corner
Raccoon Township, Gallia County: east
Perry Township, Gallia County: southeast
Greenfield Township, Gallia County: south
Jefferson Township: west
Franklin Township: northwest

Part of the village of Oak Hill is located in western Madison Township.

Name and history
Madison was organized as one of the original townships of Jackson Township, and was named for James Madison. It is one of twenty Madison Townships statewide.

Government
The township is governed by a three-member board of trustees, who are elected in November of odd-numbered years to a four-year term beginning on the following January 1. Two are elected in the year after the presidential election and one is elected in the year before it. There is also an elected township fiscal officer, who serves a four-year term beginning on April 1 of the year after the election, which is held in November of the year before the presidential election. Vacancies in the fiscal officership or on the board of trustees are filled by the remaining trustees.

References

External links
County website

Townships in Jackson County, Ohio
Townships in Ohio